The Volkswagen Motorsport was a works rally team of the German car manufacturer Volkswagen, who competed in the World Rally Championship (WRC) and Dakar Rally.

The team started competing in WRC in 1978 and used different specs of Volkswagen Golfs before leaving the sport in 1990. Volkswagen competed at the Dakar Rally from 2003 to 2011, claiming three overall wins. The team made its WRC comeback in 2011 Rally Finland with a pair of Škoda Fabia S2000s, and competed with the Volkswagen Polo R WRC from the start of the 2013 World Rally Championship season to the end of the 2016 World Rally Championship season.

At the end of the 2016 season, Volkswagen Motorsport decided to withdraw from the FIA World Rally Championship.

History

Dakar (2003–2011)

In 2003, Volkswagen entered the Tarek 2WD buggy at the Dakar Rally, with Stéphane Henrard placing 6th outright. The Race Touareg 1 was introduced in 2004, when Bruno Saby finished 6th. In 2005, Jutta Kleinschmidt finished in 3rd overall. With the Race Touareg 2, Giniel de Villiers finished in 2nd place overall in 2006. In 2007, Mark Miller finished 4th overall. Volkswagen won the 2009, 2010 and 2011 Dakar Rally, the latter with the Race Touareg 3, with drivers De Villiers, Carlos Sainz and Nasser Al-Attiyah.

2011–2012

In 2011 Volkswagen competed with seven different drivers in four rallies (Rally Finland, Rallye Deutschland, Rally Catalunya and Wales Rally GB). German Christian Riedemann was the only driver competing in two rallies.

In November 2011, the team revealed they have made a multi-year contract with the French rally star Sébastien Ogier and his co-driver Julien Ingrassia.

For 2012 season, Volkswagen Motorsport continued developing their Polo R World Rally Car and they also completed a full WRC-campaign (except New Zealand) with a pair of Škoda Fabias. Sébastien Ogier drove it in every round of the campaign, while the second car was shared between Andreas Mikkelsen and Kevin Abbring. The team had a third car in their home rally Germany driven by Sepp Wiegand.

The season included some highlights, including Sébastien Ogier's unexpected special stage win in Sardinia. Ogier's fifth place in Sardinia also remains the best ever overall finish for a S2000 car in World Rally Championship. Also important to mention that Mikkelsen was the first ever S2000 driver to score Power Stage points, which he did during 2012 Rallye Deutschland by finishing 3rd on the penultimate stage.

In October, Volkswagen Motorsport announced that they have signed Jari-Matti Latvala with his co-driver Miikka Anttila to join Ogier and Ingrassia to drive Volkswagen Polo R WRC for 2013 season.

2013

Volkswagen Motorsport entered as a fully-fledged manufacturer team in 2013. Sébastien Ogier and Jari-Matti Latvala started the season, whilst Andreas Mikkelsen joined the championship at the fourth round in Portugal. Mikkelsen and his new co-driver Mikko Markkula were registered under a second manufacturer team, known as “Volkswagen Motorsport II” so as to give them as much time as possible testing the Polo R WRC.

The 2013 season started with Rallye Monte-Carlo. Volkswagen entered the rally with two cars, Latvala/Anttila and Ogier/Ingrassia. Ogier started their campaign with a dream start by winning the very first stage of the season, and the first of Volkswagen Polo R WRC. Ogier won one more stage and finished the rally in second place, nearly two minutes behind the winner Sébastien Loeb. Jari-Matti Latvala's rally ended in last evening of the rally when he hit the wall in slippery conditions.

The team took its first WRC victory in their second rally with the World Rally Car, when Sébastien Ogier dominated the Rally Sweden being fastest in half of the stages of the rally. Jari-Matti Latvala finished fourth, and also scored his first stage win with the team.

Ogier continued his dominance at the next event in Rally Mexico, giving the team its second victory in a row. Ogier won 16 out of 23 stages and lead the rally from the second stage till the finish. Latvala hit a rock in SS2 and after restarting in Day 2 he eventually finished outside of the points. That meant Volkswagen was still 6 points behind Citroën in Manufacturers' standings before moving on to Rally de Portugal.

2014

2015

2016 

2016 would turn out to be another successful year for the team; as they collected their fourth consecutive manufacturers’ championship, and Sébastien Ogier claimed his fourth consecutive drivers’ championship.

Just days after the 2016 Wales Rally GB, Volkswagen announced that they would be pulling out of the WRC at the end of the 2016 season. This came as a surprise to many fans and journalists, as the team and their drivers had already been conducting major development and testing work on the new 2017 Polo, based on the new generation WRC cars. Although no direct reason was given for the teams’ withdrawal, it was widely speculated to be a result of Volkswagen’s recent emissions scandal.

2018
Volkswagen Motorsport is scheduled to make a return to the World Rally Championship with an R5 version of the Volkswagen Polo GTI. The car will make its debut at the 2018 Rally Catalunya, with entries for both Petter Solberg and Eric Camilli.

2019 
In November 2019, Volkswagen announced that, consistent with its shift in focus to emphasize the manufacturing of electric vehicles, it would end all motorsport programmes that do not involve electric vehicles.

Complete WRC results

WRC victories

Dakar Rally results

See also

 Citroën World Rally Team
 M-Sport World Rally Team

References

External links

Volkswagen Motorsport official website 

German auto racing teams
Volkswagen in motorsport
World Rally Championship teams
Red Bull sports teams
German racecar constructors